NA-99 Faisalabad-V is a constituency for the National Assembly of Pakistan.

Members of Parliament

2018-2022: NA-105 Faisalabad-V

Election 2002 

General elections were held on 10 Oct 2002. Rana Asif Tauseef of PML-N won by 43,547 votes.

Election 2008 

General elections were held on 18 Feb 2008. Rana Asif Tauseef of PML-Q won by 74,349 votes.

Election 2013 

General elections were held on 11 May 2013. Mian Muhammad Farooq of PML-N won by 96,039 votes and became the  member of National Assembly of Pakistan.

Election 2018 
General elections were held on 25 July 2018.

See also
NA-98 Faisalabad-IV
NA-100 Faisalabad-VI

References

External links
 Election result's official website

NA-080